Maurice Davis (December 15, 1921 – December 14, 1993) was a rabbi and activist. He served on the President's Commission on Equal Opportunity, in the Lyndon B. Johnson Administration and was a director of the American Family Foundation, now known as the International Cultic Studies Association. Davis was the rabbi of the Jewish Community Center of White Plains, New York and a regular contributor to The Jewish Post and Opinion.

Personal and family life
Rabbi Davis married Marion Cronbach, daughter of Rose Hentil and prominent reform rabbi and well-known pacifist (and Davis's teacher) Abraham Cronbach. Davis and his wife had two children, both went on to become rabbis.

Civil rights work

In 1952, Davis founded the Kentucky Committee on Desegregation. In 1965, he walked with Martin Luther King Jr. in Alabama, on the third of the Selma to Montgomery marches, and was appointed to the Equal Employment Opportunity Commission by President Johnson.

Anti-cult activity and opposition to the Unification Church
In 1970, when two of his congregants' children joined the Unification Church of the United States, Davis educated himself about the nature and methods of groups he considered to be cults. He assisted the parents of "cult children". Davis directed and appeared in the film, You Can Go Home Again, produced by the Union of American Hebrew Congregations. Davis reported that he observed commonalities among the young people he counseled who had joined the Unification Church. He found that most of them were dropouts from mainline churches or synagogues – and that they were on a quest for idealism, community and a sense of belonging.

In 1972, Davis founded the group Citizens Engaged in Reuniting Families (CERF), a national anti-Unification Church organization, which by 1976 was comprised 500 families. In November 1976, Rabbi Davis spoke at Temple Israel of Northern Westchester, New York, on "The Moon People And Our Children". He compared the Unification Church to the Hitler Youth and the Peoples Temple.

Activism for Judaism
In 1990, Davis criticized people who refer to themselves as Jews for Jesus, Hebrew Christians or Messianic Jews as being "devious" and "deceptive". He further stated that people who accept Jesus as the Messiah are, by definition, Christians and not Jewish.

Quotes
Brotherhood postponed. The time has come, and it has been a long time in coming. The time has come to worship with our lives as with our lips, in the streets as in the sanctuaries. And we who dare to call God, God, must begin to learn the challenge which that word contains.
We know, and we must never forget, that every path leads somewhere. The path of segregation leads to lynching. The path of anti-Semitism leads to Auschwitz. The path of cults leads to Jonestown. We ignore this fact at our peril.
The last time I ever witnessed a movement that had these qualifications: (1) a totally monolithic movement with a single point of view and a single authoritarian head; (2) replete with fanatical followers who are prepared and programmed to do anything their master says; (3) supplied by absolutely unlimited funds; (4) with a hatred of everyone on the outside; (5) with suspicion of parents, against their parents—the last movement that had those qualifications was the Nazi youth movement, and I'll tell you, I'm scared.
They [Messianic Jews] have distorted our holidays, demeaned our faith, misstated our history, and belittled a legacy which we have spent centuries preserving and enlarging.
I keep thinking what happens when the power of love is twisted into the love of power.
I am here to protest against child molesters. For as surely as there are those who lure children with lollipops in order to rape their bodies, so, too, do these lure children with candy-coated lies in order to rape their minds.
Herbert L. Rosedale, at the time president of the American Family Foundation, said of Davis:  "A great and gentle radiance has left our scene with the death of Rabbi Maurice Davis. He was one of the people who first brought me into the circle of those devoted to helping cult victims. His compassion and vision were inspiring. He saw clearly the dangers which awaited those who lost their free will to totalism."

Works
You Can Go Home Again, film director, produced by Union of American Hebrew Congregations.

See also
Anti-cult movement
Mind control
Unification Church and Judaism
Unification Church of the United States

References

External links

Rocky Mountain Hai - Rabbi JayR (Bahir) Davis (official website)
Congregation Emanu-El, Wichita, KS
Indianapolis Hebrew Congregation
Rabbi Davis' sermon after marching with Rev Dr. Martin Luther King

1921 births
1993 deaths
American Reform rabbis
American human rights activists
Unification Church and Judaism
Critics of the Unification Church
People from Palm Coast, Florida
Deprogrammers
Selma to Montgomery marches
Jewish anti-racism activists
Jewish human rights activists
Rabbis from New York (state)
People from Providence, Rhode Island
20th-century American rabbis